Cork University Hospital Group was a hospital network in County Cork, Ireland.  It consisted of:
 Cork University Hospital
 Mallow General Hospital
 St. Mary's Health Campus

The hospitals are now part of a revised hospital group structure, with all three hospitals becoming part of the South/Southwest Hospital Group.

References

See also
List of hospitals in Ireland

University College Cork